Thomas J. Graham (born June 26, 1962) is an American orthopedic surgeon, inventor, author, business owner, and hospital executive. Practicing in Dayton, Ohio Graham has become one of the best-known and most popular orthopedic surgeons and has performed on many high-profile athletes.

He's also served as team doctor for numerous professional franchises, including the Washington Football Team, Washington Nationals, and Philadelphia Flyers.

Education and Training 
Graham received his undergraduate degree from Williams College in Massachusetts (1984). Graham received his medical degree from the University of Cincinnati Medical School (’88) and completed his residency in orthopaedic surgery at the University of Michigan (’93).

Graham had fellowships in hand and upper extremity surgery at the Indiana Hand Center in Indianapolis and at the Mayo Clinic, where he fulfilled the nation's first fellowship in elbow surgery.

Career 
In 2000, Graham became director of the Curtis National Hand Center, located at MedStar Union Memorial Hospital. Then in 2002, he became director of MedStar SportsHealth, building the leadership hospital-based sports medicine program. Graham also served as chief of Union Memorial Hospital's Division of Hand Surgery.

In 2010, Graham became chairman of Cleveland Clinic Innovations and the inaugural Chief Innovation Officer at Cleveland Clinic. Graham later distilled his experiences in innovation and healthcare leadership in his book Innovation the Cleveland Clinic Way: Powering Transformation by Putting Ideas to Work.

Dr. Graham is credited with more than 35 patients

Notable Patients 
Graham has performed surgery on more than 2000 professional athletes and consulted with more. Most notably, he's treated or consulted with Arnold Palmer, David Ortiz, Shaquille O'Neill, and Kyrie Irving.

References

1962 births
Living people
American orthopedic surgeons